Fenrir Inc is a software company based in the Umeda district of Osaka, Japan.
Fenrir Inc. develops the Sleipnir Web browser for Windows, Mac, Android, iPhone / iPad and Windows Phone.

History
Fenrir Inc. was established in June, 2005 after the source code of the original version of Sleipnir was stolen. 
Sleipnir 2 announced in October, 2005.
Sleipnir Mobile for Android Web browser released on September 15, 2011.
Sleipnir 3 for Mac Web browser released on November 2, 2011.
Sleipnir 3 for Windows Web browser released on November 16, 2011.

Software
Sleipnir - Web browser available for Windows, Mac, Android, iPhone / iPad and Windows Phone. 
Fenrir Pass - Cloud service to sync bookmarks and services.
FenrirFS - File management software.
SnapCrab - Screen capture application.
PictBear - Paint and image editing application.
Inkiness - Drawing app for iOS.
FlickAddress - Address book app for iOS.

Software in Japan

Fenrir Inc. has provided a variety of products to Japanese users.

Grani - Collaboration Web browser offering designs of various companies and characters. The following designs are available:

Kabukibito, Shonenjump (Naruto, Bleach, One Piece), Modern pets, Fueki, Mr Men Little Miss, Gaspard et Lisa, Pingu, Suumo, Thomas, Cerezo Osaka, Aronzo, Gloomy, Urban Research, Cybozu, Infoseek Rakuten.

Sleipnirstart - A start page for accessing all favourite sites and searching them. Sites include Yahoo, Rakuten, Gyao, Hatena.

References

External links

Software companies of Japan
Companies based in Osaka Prefecture
Software companies established in 2005
Japanese companies established in 2005
Japanese brands